Zheng Zhenduo (Cheng Chen-to; December 19, 1898 – October 17, 1958), courtesy name Xidi, was a Chinese journalist, writer, archaeologist and scholar. His pen names were Baofen (寶芬), Guo Yuanxin (郭源新) and CT.

He made a significant contribution towards the establishment of the Chinese literature and the editing of a variety of literary magazines. In 1921, he, Geng Jizhi (耿濟之), Jiang Boli (蔣百里), Shen Yanbing (沈雁冰) and others organized Wenxue yanjiu hui (Literary Study Society 文學研究會).  In 1923, he became the chief editor of Fiction Monthly (小說月報). In addition, he in succession participated in editing min chao(閩潮), xin Shehui (新社會), wenxue xunkan (文學旬刊). In late 1931, he became a professor at both Yenching University and Tsinghua University, the president of Faculty of Arts and the director of Chinese department of Jinan University. He was also the chief editor of Shijie wenku (The World's Library 世界文庫) at the same time. After the establishment of the People's Republic of China, he was assigned to be head of the Cultural Relic Bureau (文物局), Director of the Institute of Archaeology of the Chinese Academy of Sciences and literary research institute, the assistant minister of cultural department, committee member of State Council scientific program committee and Chinese Academy of Science philosophical social sciences, the vice-chairman of Chinese folk literature and art research council, etc. He died in a plane crash in the Soviet Union during his journey in 1958.

Biography

Family
Zheng Zhenduo was born on 19 December 1898 in Yongjia, Zhejiang Province.  His ancestral home was in Changle, Fujian province. He was born in a poor family. Together with two younger sisters, he was raised by his mother because his father and grandfather died when he was still a teenager.

He was named "Zhenduo" (振鐸) by his grandfather. "Zhen" (振) denotes arousing an action and "Duo" (鐸) is a kind of big bell. His grandfather wanted him to ring like a great bell to summon and to arouse people. Besides, his grandfather gave him the childhood name "Mu Guan" (Wooden official 木官).

Schooling
In 1917, Zheng began studying at the Beijing Railway Management School (北京铁路管理传习所) and graduated in March 1921.  Beyond classroom, he read a lot of books and developed an enormous interest in social sciences, Chinese literature and Western literature and thus developed a critical mind.  During the May Fourth Movement, he was a student representative, spreading the news of student movements in Beijing. In 1919, he helped publish two magazines called Xin Shehui (新社會 "New Society") and Jiuguo jiangyan zhoubao (救國講演周報 "National Salvation Speeches Weekly").

In January 1921, Zheng Zhenduo and twelve others, including Mao Dun and Ye Shengtao founded the earliest literary society of the New Literature Movement, Wenxue yanjiu hui (Literary Research Association 文學研究會, also known as the Literary Association), which advocated realism and opposed art for art's sake.

Careers throughout his life
Zheng had been a journalist, a modern writer, archeology and a literature scholar throughout his life.

In May 1921, Zheng helped set up a drama society called Minzhong Xiju She (Demotic opera troupe 民眾戲劇社) with Mao Dun, Ye Shengtao, Chen Dabei, Ouyang Yuqian, Xiong Foxi and other writers. They published a monthly magazine named Xiju (Drama 戲劇) on 31 May in the same year.

In 1922, Zheng established the first magazine for children, Children's World (兒童世界) In January 1923, he became the chief editor of a monthly magazine of novel, Fiction Monthly (小說月報). After the May 30 Incident in 1925, he helped founding a newspaper called Gongli Ribao (公理日報). From then on, he wrote many books including Zhongguo Wenxue Shi (History of Chinese literature 中國文學史, 1938) and 1943 Diary (1943年日記).

Zheng had been a scholar giving lectures in universities, a researcher of the academy and a journalist since 1931. He taught in the Department of Chinese in Yenching University, in Jinan University from 1935 to 1941 as the Dean of faculty of Arts and in Peking University since 1953. After 1949, he became the Secretary for the Culture Department and Cultural Heritage Department in China.

Exile to France
In April 1927, Chiang Kai-shek launched a sudden attack on thousands of suspected Communists in the area he controlled. Many innocent students and movement activists were killed. Writers, including Zheng, were under political pressure. Therefore, he left his family for France in May 1927. During the years living in Paris, he kept mailing his diary to his wife, which was published as a book named Ouxing Riji (Diary of travels in Europe 歐行日記).

Return to China
He continued his journalistic career after coming back to China in 1929 and founded Jiuwang Ribao (救亡日報). In October 1945, he founded a weekly magazine called Democracy (民主) to oppose Chiang Kai-shek's pro-US policy and urge people to stop civil wars.

Cultural Preservation
Due to the invasion of Japanese troops, Shanghai was besieged starting from 1937 and many significant cultural assets were lost. In the light of this, Zheng devoted himself to the rescue and protection of aged Chinese documents and antiques. Chen was a founding member of the Shanghai "Rare Book Preservation Society" and its leader.  Disguising himself as a staff member in a stationery store, named Chan Sixun (陳思訓), he managed to save many aged books from damage or loss to the outside world.

Death
On 17 October 1958, Zheng led national cultural delegates to visit Arabia and Afghanistan.  He died in the crash of a Tupolev Tu-104 in Kanash, Chuvashia, Soviet Union during the journey.

Journalism
Zheng started his journalistic career in the 1920s during the May Fourth Movement. Together with some classmates including Zhong Tao (仲陶), he got a first taste of editing in starting a publication named Jiuguo Jiangyan Zhoukan (救國講演周刊). The magazine - being published in Wenzhou for only 6 to 7 times - was closed by the authorities since it enraged a government official.

As one of the founders of a youth magazine, Xin Shehui (新社會), Zheng aimed at criticizing the Beijing government. It began its publication on 1 November 1919, which consisted of four pages. The aims of the magazine was to:

advocate the social service
discuss society problems
introduce social theories
research on common people education
record society matters
criticize society shortcomings
narrate society real states
report news of the organization

Zheng gave many speeches about the student movement in Beijing. On top of criticizing, he wanted to make good use of the New Culture Movement (新文化運動) to publicize and promote new social ideals for the Chinese future development. Chen Duxiu suggested that Xin Shehui could be edited with a more approachable style accepted by the general public. The magazine was finally published on 1 November 1919 throughout China, arousing tides of attention from the public, especially amongst the young readers. However, as Zheng and his co-editors were still inexperienced in editing by that time, the magazine was thought to be immature in editing and too sloganeered. On the hand, the content of the magazine upset the military side of the government. Thus, in one month's time, the government called the publication to a halt.

In addition, he established Wenxue Yanjiu Hui (Literary Study Society 文學研究會) with Mao Dun and Ye Shengtao in November 1920. In January 1923, he took over the position of chief editor of  Fiction Monthly from Mao Dun. He was the chief editor on and off for nearly 9 years. He advocated a literary advocacy of "Blood and Tears" and supported a writing style of realism.

In June 1925, he founded a newspaper called Kongli Ribao (公理日報) with Wu Yuzhi and Ye Shengtao in Shanghai. This newspaper was aimed at criticizing the "May Thirtieth Incident" and the rising foreign imperialism in China.

Also, he contributed in various newspapers like Jiuguo Jiangyan Zhoubao (救國講演周報) and Xinxue Bao (新學報) to awaken Chinese people from old traditions. These articles were mainly about social issues and the evil deeds of the old traditional practices. Zheng wrote articles from different aspects like the liberation of women, morality, social psychology and the liberation of political power. They all advocated more people to rethink the old values position.

Contribution to literature

Translation
Zheng was proficient in foreign languages including English, Russian, Indian languages, Greek and Latin. He did a great job in translating a lot of Russian and Indian literature.

Zheng had started translation of Russian literature since early 20s. His works included the works, paper and preface of Turgenev (1818-1883), Gogol (1809-1852), Chekov (1860-1904), Gorky (1868-1936) and Tolstoy (1828-1910).

Zheng also translated many Indian literature. He mainly translated the poems as well as the Indian ancient-times fable such as Rabindranath Tagore (1861-1941). Zheng had translated a prominent number of Tagore's poems to Chinese since the 1920s. In October 1922, he published his translation of Stray Birds (飛鳥集). In August 1925, he published The Indian Fable (印度寓言). There were 55 translation works of his in total.

Zheng started his study in Greek and Roman literature in his early age. In 1929, he published The Story of Love (戀愛的故事). Afterwards he translated The Hero Legends of Greek and Roman Myth Legends (希臘羅馬神話傳說中的英雄傳說). Then in 1935, he published a book called The Legends of Greece (希臘神話), which was three to four times thicker than his previous one. After liberation, in the second edition of The Legends of Greece, he introduced Karl Marx's well-known discourse in The Introductory of political and economical criticism (政治經濟批判導言) which was about ancient times mythology to analyze Greek mythology.

Literature Union
As the previous newspapers and magazines were banned by the government, Zheng believed that a proper established literature union would make things run easier. In January 1921, he established Wenxue Yanjiu Hui (Literary Study Society 文學研究會), which literally means literature research union, with Mao Dun(茅盾), Ye Shengtao (葉紹鈞) and 12 other people in the related field.

The Union's first publication was Wenxue Xunkan (文學旬刊). It was published along with the well known newspaper called Shishi Xinbao (Current events newspaper 時事新報). He revealed the goal of the publication and the literature views of the union. He believed that literature is important and capable to influence the society. It was not merely an era, a place or one's reflection, but it acted as a frontier, which could affect the morality of human beings. Also, he strongly opposed to the old style of Chinese literature, of setting leisure and religions as main themes. He supported the writing of life – one theme in new realism literature approach.

He also expressed his view on the development of Chinese literature. As the connection between the Chinese literature and the world's literature was far too little, the Chinese lofty spirit could not be shared by the rest of the world. He treated that as the Chinese's biggest humiliation. Therefore, he was so devoted in the field of literature, eagered to strive for a higher position of the Chinese literature in the world. Under the influence of the May Fourth Movement, he thought that the major responstility of the Chinese Literature was to inspire youngsters' revolutionary mission in order to strengthen the power of China.

Realism
Within the May Fourth movement, he adhered the direction of realism for New literature era. He thought literature liked 'mirror of a life'. This means his writing mostly revealed the real faces of societies. Also, he put a lot of emphasis on the importance of creative living. During his long composing and researching career, he showed a fully comprehensive realism of literature. He thought that literature must contribute to "life":

We need the "blood" of literature, "tears" of literature. Both of them will become the trend of Chinese literature; the writing consists of not only "blood" and "tears", but also consists of "literature"; the "blood" and "tears" experience and feeling of author are aesthetic for success in writing.

Literature should consist of the highest ideal of the author, which form the soul of the article, in order to make it meaningful to the readers and the whole of society.

Classical literature
Starting from the late 1920s, Zheng was teaching Chinese literature History in universities. At that time, he did much in making research in Chinese classical writing. For example, he used his pen name, Bao Fun, to write Yuenqu Xulu (元曲敍錄) in the Novel Monthly (小說月報). Also, he finished editing The History of the Chinese Literature (中國文學史) in 1930.

Romanticism
Zheng put heavy emphasis on emotional elements in literature, highlighting its importance in distinguishing between literature and science. He advocated that literature functions to instill a passion in the readers' heart. One example was the historical novel, Arrest of the fire stealer (取火者的逮捕).

Works

Academic
《中國古代木刻畫選集》 (Zhongguo gu dai mu ke hua xuan ji) (Selected ancient Chinese woodcuts)
《文學大綱》 (Wen xue da gang) (Outline of literature)
《插圖本中國文學史》 (Cha tu ben Zhongguo wen xue shi) (Illustrated history of Chinese literature)
《中國俗文學史》 (Zhongguo su wen xue shi) (History of Chinese popular literature)
《中國文學論集》 (Zhongguo wen xue lun ji) (Essays on Chinese literature)
《俄國文學史略》 (Eguo wen xue shi lüe) (Brief history of Russian literature)
《佝僂集》 (Goulou ji) (Rickets)
《西諦書話》 (Xidi shu hua) (Xidi on books)
《鄭振鐸文集》 (Zheng Zhenduo wen ji) (Collected works of Zheng Zhenduo)
《談〈金瓶梅詞話〉》 (Tan Jin Ping Mei Cihua) (On Plum in the Golden Vase)
《編輯方針與編輯計劃》 (Bianji fangzhen yu bianji jihua) (Editing: policy and plan )

Novels
《取火者的逮捕》 (Arrest of the fire-stealer)
《桂公塘》 (Gui gong tang)
《家庭的故事》 (Jia Ting de Gu Shi)

Prose
He wrote more than 20 prose texts and the following are some of the examples:

《中山集記》 (Shan zhong Za Ji)
《海燕》 (Hai Yan)
《避暑會》 (Bei Shu Hui)
《大同》 (Da Tong)
《山市》 (Shan Shi)
《離別》 (Li Bie)
《貓》  (Mao) (Cat)
《歐行日記》 (Ou xing ri ji ) (Diary of Travels in Europe)
《最後一課》 (Zui Hou yi ke)
《月夜之話》 (Rou Ye Ji Hua )

Magazines and newspapers
新社會 (Xin Shehui) (New Society)
兒童世界 (Children's World)
戲劇 (Xiju)(Drama)
救國講演周刊 (Jiuguo Jiangyan Zhoukan)
小說月報 (Novel Monthly)
新學報 (Xinxue Bao)
時事新報 (Shishi xinbao) (Current events newspaper)
救亡日報 (Jiuwang Ribao)

Chief editing
《世界文庫》 (Shi jie wen ku) (The World's Library)
《醒世恒言》 (Xingshi hengyan)
《警世通言》 (Jingshi tongyan)

Translation works
《戀愛的故事》 (The Story of Love)
《飛鳥集》(StrayBird)
《俄國戰曲集》 (The Russian War Collections) 
《灰色馬》 (Grey Horse)
《印度寓言》 (The Indian Fable)
《希臘羅馬神話傳說中的英雄傳說》 (The Hero Legends of Greek and Roman Myth Legends)
《希臘神話》 (The Legends of Greece)
《列那狐的歷史》 ( The History of Liena Fox)

References
 Chen, Fukang. (1996). Yi dai cai hua: Zheng Zhenduo zhuan 《一代才華:鄭振鐸傳》 (Biography of Zheng Zhenduo). Shanghai: Shanghai People's Press (上海人民出版社). 
 Zheng, Erkang. (1998). Shiliu you hong le: huiyi wo de fuqin Zheng Zhenduo 《石榴又紅了：回憶我的父親鄭振鐸》 (The pomegranates are red again: Remembering my father, Zheng Zhenduo). Beijing: Renmin University Press (人民大學出版社). 
 Chen, Fukang. (1997). Ming jia jian zhuan shu xi:Zheng Zhenduo 《名家簡傳書系-鄭振鐸》(Biographies of famous figures: Zheng Zhenduo). Beijing: Zhong guo hua qiao publishing house (中國華僑出版社). 
 Zheng, Zhenduo & Zheng, Erkang. (1986). Zhongguo xian dai zuo jia xuan ji - Zheng Zhenduo 《中國現代作家選集 – 鄭振鐸》. (Selected works of modern Chinese authors – Zheng Zhenduo) Hong Kong: San lian shu dian Xianggang fen dian; Beijing: Renmin wenxue Press (人民大學出版社). 
 Zheng, Erkang. (2002). Xing yun gao qiu : Zheng Zhenduo zhuan 《星隕高秋 : 鄭振鐸傳》(Star fallen at height of autumn: Biography of Zheng Zhenduo). Beijing: Jinghua Press. 
 Lu, Rongchun. (1998). Zheng Zhenduo zhuan (Biography of Zheng Zhenduo) 《鄭振鐸傳》. Fuzhou: Haixia wenyi Press (華廈文藝出版社).

External links
A concise biography of Zheng (English)
A description of famous scholar (Chinese)
The literary works of Zheng Zhenduo 鄭振鐸文集 (Chinese)
The Love story between Zheng and Gao (Chinese) 
President of "Pole Raising Club". Zheng Zhenduo 抬杠會長鄭振鐸 (Chinese)
Content of The World's Library edited by Zheng Zhenduo (Chinese)

1898 births
1958 deaths
Chinese archaeologists
Academic staff of Yenching University
Republic of China journalists
People's Republic of China writers
Writers from Wenzhou
Chinese publishers (people)
Educators from Wenzhou
Academic staff of Tsinghua University
Academic staff of Fu Jen Catholic University
Academic staff of Jinan University
Victims of aviation accidents or incidents in the Soviet Union
Victims of aviation accidents or incidents in 1958
Chinese literary theorists
20th-century archaeologists